Microglyphis japonica is a species of sea snail, a marine gastropod mollusk in the family Ringiculidae.

References

External links

Ringiculidae
Gastropods described in 1952